3054 Strugatskia, provisional designation , is a dark Themistian asteroid from the outer regions of the asteroid belt, approximately  in diameter. It was discovered on 11 September 1977, by Soviet–Russian astronomer Nikolai Chernykh at the Crimean Astrophysical Observatory in Nauchnij, on the Crimean peninsula. The asteroid was named after the brothers Arkady and Boris Strugatsky, two Russian science fiction authors.

Orbit and classification 

Strugatskia is a Themistian asteroid that belongs to the Themis family, a very large family of carbonaceous asteroids, named after 24 Themis. It orbits the Sun in the outer asteroid belt at a distance of 2.4–3.7 AU once every 5 years and 5 months (1,986 days; semi-major axis of 3.09 AU). Its orbit has an eccentricity of 0.21 and an inclination of 2° with respect to the ecliptic.

The body's observation arc begins at Goethe Link Observatory in May 1959, more than 18 years prior to its official discovery observation at Nauchnij.

Physical characteristics 

Although the asteroid's spectral type is unknown, its albedo indicates a carbonaceous composition, which agrees with C-type classification for the Themistian asteroids.

Rotation period 

As of 2018, no rotational lightcurve of Strugatskia has been obtained from photometric observations. The body's rotation period, pole and shape remain unknown.

Diameter and albedo 

According to the survey carried out by the NEOWISE mission of NASA's Wide-field Infrared Survey Explorer, Strugatskia measures 26.921 kilometers in diameter and its surface has an albedo of 0.056, typical for carbonaceous asteroids.

Naming 

This minor planet was named after the brothers Arkady Strugatsky (1925–1991) and Boris Strugatsky (1933–2012), two Russian science fiction authors who often worked in collaboration. The official naming citation was published by the Minor Planet Center on 2 July 1985.

References

External links 
 Asteroid Lightcurve Database (LCDB), query form (info )
 Dictionary of Minor Planet Names, Google books
 Asteroids and comets rotation curves, CdR – Observatoire de Genève, Raoul Behrend
 Discovery Circumstances: Numbered Minor Planets (1)-(5000) – Minor Planet Center
 
 

003054
Discoveries by Nikolai Chernykh
Named minor planets
19770911